Belleville (French: "Belle ville" meaning "Beautiful city / town") is a township in Essex County, in the U.S. state of New Jersey. As of the 2020 United States census, the township's population was 38,222, an increase of 2,296 (+6.4%) from the 2010 census count of 35,926, which in turn reflected a decline of two people from the 35,928 counted in the 2000 Census.

History

Originally known as "Second River" or "Washington", the inhabitants renamed the settlement "Belleville" in 1797. Belleville was originally incorporated as a township by an act of the New Jersey Legislature on April 8, 1839, from portions of Bloomfield. Portions of the township were taken to create Woodside Township (March 24, 1869, now defunct) and Franklin Township (February 18, 1874, now known as Nutley). The independent municipality of Belleville city was created within the township on March 27, 1874, and was dissolved on February 22, 1876. On November 16, 1910, Belleville was reincorporated as a town, based on the results of a referendum held eight days earlier.

In 1870, Belleville became the first city on the East Coast of the United States with a Chinatown. While much of the country (especially the Western states) had strong anti-Chinese sentiment, the town welcomed a group of Chinese workers from the West Coast who had been workers on building the Central Pacific Railroad. This group of people eventually formed the basis for Chinatowns in Newark and New York City.

In 1981, the town was one of seven Essex County municipalities to pass a referendum to become a township, joining four municipalities that had already made the change, of what would ultimately be more than a dozen Essex County municipalities to reclassify as townships in order take advantage of federal revenue sharing policies that allocated townships a greater share of government aid to municipalities on a per capita basis.

Frankie Valli and the band The Four Seasons formed in Belleville, as did The Delicates, the late 50s / early 60s girl group made up of Denise Ferri, Arleen Lanzotti and Peggy Santiglia.

In 1994, Congress passed a resolution recognizing Belleville as the birthplace of the Industrial Revolution in the United States.

Geography
According to the United States Census Bureau, the township had a total area of 3.37 square miles (8.71 km2), including 3.30 square miles (8.54 km2) of land and 0.07 square miles (0.18 km2) of water (2.05%).

Silver Lake (2010 total population of 4,243) is an unincorporated community and census-designated place (CDP) defined by the United States Census Bureau as of the 2010 Census that is split between Belleville (with 3,769 of the CDP's residents) and Bloomfield (474 of the total).

Other unincorporated communities, localities and place names located partially or completely within the township include Belwood, Big Tree and Soho.

The Second River forms much of the border between Belleville and Newark as it runs through Branch Brook Park.

The township of Belleville has given itself the nickname the Cherry Blossom Capital of America, with an annual display that is larger than the famed Tidal Basin in Washington, D.C., site of the National Cherry Blossom Festival.

The township borders the municipalities of Bloomfield, Newark and Nutley in Essex County; Lyndhurst and North Arlington in Bergen County; and Kearny in Hudson County.

Demographics

2010 census

The Census Bureau's 2006–2010 American Community Survey showed that (in 2010 inflation-adjusted dollars) median household income was $60,127 (with a margin of error of +/− $2,658) and the median family income was $69,181 (+/− $4,525). Males had a median income of $46,656 (+/− $2,959) versus $42,237 (+/− $2,818) for females. The per capita income for the township was $27,668 (+/− $1,357). About 3.7% of families and 6.0% of the population were below the poverty line, including 7.0% of those under age 18 and 6.6% of those age 65 or over.

2000 census
As of the 2000 United States census there were 35,928 people, 13,731 households, and 9,089 families residing in the township. The population density was 10,744.3 people per square mile (4,153.3/km2). There were 14,144 housing units at an average density of 4,229.8 per square mile (1,635.0/km2). The racial makeup of the township was 69.44% White, 5.36% African American, 0.17% Native American, 11.31% Asian, 0.07% Pacific Islander, 9.83% from other races, and 3.82% from two or more races. Hispanic or Latino of any race were 23.68% of the population.

As of the 2000 Census, the most common ancestries listed were Italian (30.9%), Irish (9.4%), German (6.9%), Polish (4.5%), United States (2.6%) and English (2.2%).

There were 13,731 households, out of which 29.5% had children under the age of 18 living with them, 47.0% were married couples living together, 13.9% had a female householder with no husband present, and 33.8% were non-families. 27.9% of all households were made up of individuals, and 9.1% had someone living alone who was 65 years of age or older. The average household size was 2.60 and the average family size was 3.23.

In the township the population was spread out, with 21.8% under the age of 18, 8.7% from 18 to 24, 33.9% from 25 to 44, 22.2% from 45 to 64, and 13.4% who were 65 years of age or older. The median age was 36 years. For every 100 females, there were 93.2 males. For every 100 females age 18 and over, there were 89.8 males.

The median income for a household in the township was $48,576, and the median income for a family was $55,212. Males had a median income of $38,074 versus $31,729 for females. The per capita income for the township was $22,093. About 6.3% of families and 8.2% of the population were below the poverty line, including 10.9% of those under age 18 and 7.8% of those age 65 or over.

Government

Local government
Belleville is governed within the Faulkner Act, formally known as the Optional Municipal Charter Law, under the Council-Manager form of New Jersey municipal government. The township is one of 42 municipalities (of the 564) statewide that use this form of government. The governing body is comprised of a seven-member Township Council, of which two members are elected at-large, one is elected at-large as a mayor, and one each is chosen from four wards, with elections held on a non-partisan basis as part of the May municipal election. Members are elected in even-numbered years to serve four-year terms of office on a staggered basis, with the four ward seats up for vote together and the two at-large seats and the mayoral seat up for vote two years later.

, the mayor of Belleville is Michael A. Melham, whose term of office ends June 30, 2026. Members of the Belleville Township Council are Deputy Mayor Thomas Graziano (at-large; 2026), Vincent Cozzarelli (Ward 3; 2024), Naomy De Peña (at-large; 2026), John J. Notari (Ward 4; 2024), Steven J. Rovell (Ward 2; 2024) and Marie Strumolo-Burke (Ward 1; 2024).

The Township Manager is Anthony D. Iacono.

Federal, state, and county representation
Belleville is located in the 11th Congressional District and is part of New Jersey's 29th state legislative district. 

Prior to the 2011 reapportionment following the 2010 Census, Belleville had been in the 28th state legislative district.

Politics
As of March 2011, there were a total of 19,684 registered voters in Belleville, of which 7,241 (36.8%) were registered as Democrats, 2,708 (13.8%) were registered as Republicans and 9,729 (49.4%) were registered as Unaffiliated. There were 6 voters registered as Libertarians or Greens.

In the 2012 presidential election, Democrat Barack Obama received 65.8% of the vote (8,031 cast), ahead of Republican Mitt Romney with 33.3% (4,071 votes), and other candidates with 0.9% (109 votes), among the 12,956 ballots cast by the township's 20,621 registered voters (745 ballots were spoiled), for a turnout of 62.8%. In the 2008 presidential election, Democrat Barack Obama received 56.9% of the vote here (7,475 cast), ahead of Republican John McCain with 41.4% (5,444 votes) and other candidates with 0.8% (110 votes), among the 13,135 ballots cast by the township's 19,378 registered voters, for a turnout of 67.8%. In the 2004 presidential election, Democrat John Kerry received 50.6% of the vote here (6,046 ballots cast), outpolling Republican George W. Bush with 48.0% (5,728 votes) and other candidates with 0.7% (130 votes), among the 11,940 ballots cast by the township's 17,411 registered voters, for a turnout percentage of 68.6.

In the 2013 gubernatorial election, Republican Chris Christie received 53.1% of the vote (3,170 cast), ahead of Democrat Barbara Buono with 45.8% (2,734 votes), and other candidates with 1.1% (67 votes), among the 6,050 ballots cast by the township's 20,904 registered voters (79 ballots were spoiled), for a turnout of 28.9%. In the 2009 gubernatorial election, Democrat Jon Corzine received 50.7% of the vote here (3,626 ballots cast), ahead of Republican Chris Christie with 42.6% (3,041 votes), Independent Chris Daggett with 4.6% (329 votes) and other candidates with 1.0% (72 votes), among the 7,146 ballots cast by the Township's 19,313 registered voters, yielding a 37.0% turnout.

Education

The Belleville School District serves public school students in pre-kindergarten through twelfth grade. As of the 2020–21 school year, the district, comprised of 11 schools, had an enrollment of 4,548 students and 361.0 classroom teachers (on an FTE basis), for a student–teacher ratio of 12.6:1. Schools in the district (with 2020–21 enrollment data from the National Center for Education Statistics) are 
Hornblower Early Childhood Center (60 students; in PreK), 
School 3 (322; K-5), 
School 4 (466; PreK-5), 
School 5 (375; K-5), 
School 7 (404; PreK-5), 
School 8 (464; K-5), 
School 9 (124; K-5), 
School 10 (152; K-5), 
Belleville Middle School (736; 6-8) and 
Belleville High School (1,358; 9-12).

The Belleville Public Library and Information Center had a collection of 98,603 volumes.

Transportation

Roads and highways

Route 7, Route 21 and County Route 506 all pass through Belleville.

The Belleville Turnpike Bridge (also known as the Rutgers Street Bridge) crosses the Passaic River, connecting Belleville to North Arlington. The bridge was formally renamed on July 4, 2013, as the "Lance Corporal Osbrany Montes de Oca Memorial Bridge" in memory of a United States Marine Corps soldier killed in February 2012 while serving in Afghanistan.

Public transportation
The Silver Lake station provides service to Newark Penn Station on the Newark Light Rail.

Until 1966, the Newark Branch of the Erie-Lackawanna Railroad provided train service at stations at Belleville and Cleveland Street. The New York and Greenwood Lake Railway, later the Boonton Line, also served the township. The Newark Branch tracks are now used for freight only, operated by Norfolk Southern.

NJ Transit bus service is available to and from Newark on the 13, 27, 72, 74, 90, 92, 93 and 94 bus lines.

Places of interest

 Clara Maass Medical Center is a 469-bed teaching hospital that is part of the Barnabas Health system, founded in 1868 as Newark German Hospital, and named for Clara Maass, a nurse who died after volunteering for medical experiments to study yellow fever
 Reformed Dutch Church of Second River – The church's original building was constructed in 1697 and replaced in 1725. A new structure was erected in 1807 after a tornado destroyed the previous church building, and the current church dates to 1853. More than 60 Continental Army soldiers are buried in the cemetery that adjoins the church.
 Christ Church Cemetery & Mausoleum – This cemetery was originally the first Episcopal Church in the area, established in 1746 by a land grant signed by King George II. The original burial ground still exists today, accompanied by a newer mausoleum.

Belleville locations in The Sopranos
 Episode 3 ("Denial, Anger, Acceptance"): Christopher Moltisanti's "mock execution" is on the pier in the Passaic River used by Belleville High School's crew team.
 Episode 28 ("Proshai, Livushka"): Livia Soprano's funeral is held at the Irvine-Cozzarelli Memorial Home, across the street from Belleville Middle School on Washington Avenue.
 Season 4- Even though Furio Giunta's house was stated to be in Nutley, its actual location was Belleville on Essex Street.
 Episode 55 ("Where's Johnny?"): Junior gets lost and tells the policemen who find him that he lives in Belleville.
 Episode 76 ("Cold Stones"): Rosalie Aprile briefly dates a much younger French motorcyclist named Michel, who hails from Belleville, Paris. Ro expresses a particular sense of kinship with Michel given his connection to a town with the same name as the New Jersey town where members of her inner circle live (e.g., Corrado Soprano) and do business (e.g., the Irvine-Cozzarelli Memorial Home).

1996 Torch Relay
On June 18, 1996, the Olympic Torch Relay came through Belleville. The relay entered Belleville from Rutgers, made a left onto Washington Avenue, passing the Belleville Town Hall, a right onto Belleville Avenue and stayed on Belleville into the township of Bloomfield. The torch relay ended at Atlanta, Georgia for the 1996 Summer Olympics.

Notable people

People who were born in, residents of, or otherwise closely associated with Belleville include:

 Platt Adams (1885–1961), track and field athlete who was winner of gold and silver Olympic medals
 Russell Baker (born 1925), Pulitzer Prize-winning writer Growing Up
 Chico Borja (born 1959), former professional soccer player
 Lonnie G. Bunch III (born 1952), museum director and historian
 Gilbert Luis R. Centina III (born 1947), Roman Catholic priest and author
 Ralph R. Caputo (born 1940), member of the New Jersey General Assembly who has represented the 28th Legislative District
 Kacy Catanzaro (born 1990) is a gymnast noted for being the first woman to qualify for the finals of the television sports challenge American Ninja Warrior
 Samuel Cornish (1795–1858), abolitionist and publisher of the first newspaper in the United States owned by African Americans
 Bob Crewe (1930–2014), songwriter, dancer, singer, manager, record producer and fine artist best known for producing, and co-writing together with Bob Gaudio, a string of Top 10 singles for The Four Seasons
 Robert Curvin (1934–2015), researcher and theorist on issues related to urban poverty
 Michael Devaney (1891–1967), track and field athlete who competed in the 1920 Summer Olympics and in the 1924 Summer Olympics, and was part of the team that won the gold medal in 1920 in the 3000 meter steeplechase competition
 Tommy DeVito (born 1936), musician and singer
 Dennis Diken (born 1957), drummer with The Smithereens
 Cornelius Ennis (1813–1899), cotton shipper and railroad executive who served as Mayor of Houston, Texas
 Connie Francis (born 1938), singer
 Dany Garcia (born 1969), businessperson, professional bodybuilder and film / television producer
 Bob Gaudio (born 1942), singer, songwriter and producer
 Kay Gardella (1923–2005), reporter, critic and columnist for almost 60 years at the New York Daily News
 Frances Goodrich (1890–1984), dramatist and screenwriter, best known for her collaborations with her partner and husband Albert Hackett
 Scott Graham (born 1965), Philadelphia Phillies broadcaster
 David Grant (born 1965), former NFL player
 Phil Grippaldi (born 1946) was an Olympic weightlifter who competed for the United States at the games in 1968, 1972 and 1976
 Creighton Gubanich (born 1972), catcher who played professionally in 15 games for the Boston Red Sox in 1999 and had a grand slam as his first career hit and only career home run

 Llewellyn F. Haskell (1842–1929), United States Army officer and a Union general during the American Civil War
 George Hrab (born 1971), drummer, guitarist, composer and podcaster known for performing rock, funk and jazz
 Frank Iero (born 1981), musician best known as the rhythm guitarist for the band My Chemical Romance, lead vocalist for the band Leathermouth and lead vocalist and guitarist for the band Pencey Prep
 Nick Massi (1935–2000), early member of the Four Seasons
 Tony Meola (born 1969), soccer goalie
 Paul Mirabella (born 1954), MLB player for the Texas Rangers, New York Yankees, Toronto Blue Jays, Baltimore Orioles, Seattle Mariners, and the Milwaukee Brewers
 Doris Kopsky Muller (1922–1997), cyclist who was the first woman to win a national title in cycling
 Joe Pesci (born 1943), actor
 Daniel H. Rucker (1812–1910), U.S. Army brigadier general
 Diane Ruggiero, That's Life series creator and Veronica Mars writer
 Roxana Saberi (born 1977), Iranian-American journalist arrested in Iran in February 2009
 Junior Sanchez (born 1977), DJ, record producer and remixer
 Peggy Santiglia (born 1944), singer, songwriter and lead singer The Angels
 Fred Schneider (born 1951), singer, songwriter, arranger and musician, best known as the frontman of the rock band the B-52's, of which he is a founding member
 Andrew E. Svenson (1910–1975), children's author, publisher, and partner in the Stratemeyer Syndicate, who authored or coauthored more than 70 books for children, including books in the Hardy Boys and Bobbsey Twins series
 Frankie Valli (born 1934), lead singer of the musical group The Four Seasons
 Sharon Van Etten (born 1981), singer-songwriter
 Gerard Way (born 1977), musician, singer-songwriter, and comic book writer best known as the lead singer of the band My Chemical Romance and writer of the comic series The Umbrella Academy
 Mikey Way (born 1980), musician best known as the bassist for the band My Chemical Romance
 Gus Wickie (1885–1947), German-born American bass singer, stage actor and voice of Bluto in the Fleischer Studios’ Popeye cartoons from 1935 until 1938
 Leonard R. Willette (1921–1944), Tuskegee Airman pilot killed in action in World War II flying over Germany while protecting a group of American bombers
 Bob Yudin (born 1939), former chairman of the Bergen County Republican Party

References

External links

 Township of Belleville

 
1839 establishments in New Jersey
Faulkner Act (council–manager)
Populated places established in 1839
Townships in Essex County, New Jersey